Carrickbanagher ( or Carraig Beannchar meaning "rock of the points") is a townland in County Sligo, Ireland between the towns of Collooney and Ballymote.

References

Townlands of County Sligo